WNKZ-FM is a Christian adult contemporary formatted broadcast radio station licensed to Pocomoke City, Maryland, serving Princess Anne, Salisbury, and Crisfield in Maryland. WNKZ-FM is owned and operated by The Bridge of Hope, Inc.

History
WNKZ-FM signed on as WZJZ in October 2000. On March 7, 2016, Sebago Broadcasting Company, under the licensee of GSB Broadcasting, LLC, closed on the sale of the then-WICO-FM. On the same date, WICO-FM began simulcasting its new sister station, WCTG, and that station's adult hits format. On April 1, 2017, WICO-FM went silent and returned to the air on May 1, 2017, with a simulcast of Christian adult contemporary-formatted WKNZ 88.7 FM Harrington, Delaware. On June 16, 2017, WKNZ's owner The Bridge of Hope, Inc. consummated the purchase of WICO-FM for $250,000.

On November 10, 2017, WICO-FM changed its call letters to WNKZ-FM.

References

External links

2001 establishments in Maryland
Radio stations established in 2001
NKZ-FM
Pocomoke City, Maryland
Contemporary Christian radio stations in the United States